Saint Boniface was an 8th century Christian saint and bishop.

Boniface may also refer to:

 Boniface (name), a list of people with either the given name or surname
 Boniface (cover name), the cover name of World War II Ultra decryptions
 , a steam cargo liner